Masoud Estili ( (21 September 1969 – 27 March 2011) was an Iranian football player. He also played for the Iran national futsal team in the 1996 FIFA Futsal World Championship. He was the younger brother of Hamid Estili.

Honours

Notes and references

External links
 

1969 births
2011 deaths
Sportspeople from Tehran
Iranian footballers
Iranian men's futsal players
Persepolis F.C. players
Bahman players
Pas players
Keshavarz players
Association footballers not categorized by position
20th-century Iranian people
21st-century Iranian people